Dale Beyerstein is a philosopher who has taught at Malaspina College, Douglas College, Kwantlen College, the University of British Columbia, and Langara College. Dale is a co-founder of the BC Skeptics, and director-at-large of the foundation.

Selected publications 
 The Write Stuff (ed with B.L. Beyerstein), Buffalo, NY, Prometheus Press, 1992
 "The Functions and Limitations of Professional Codes of Ethics", in Winkler, E and Coombs, J: Applied Ethics, Oxford, Basil Blackwell, 1993
 "Psychiatric Ethics and Ethical Psychiatry" (with J. Paredes, B. Ledwidge and C. Kogan), Canadian Journal of Psychiatry, Vol 35, October 1990.
 "Sai Baba's miracles: an overview" published by B. Premanand, Podanur, India, 1994

See also 
 Barry Beyerstein, his brother

References

External links 
 Langara College Faculty of Philosophy

1952 births
Living people
Canadian philosophers
Canadian skeptics
Langara College people